Hammer Creek Bridge, also known as Brunnerville Road Bridge over Hammer Creek, is a historic concrete arch bridge located at Elizabeth Township and Warwick Township in Lancaster County, Pennsylvania. It was built in 1908, and is a  single arch bridge.  The roadway crosses Hammer Creek.

It was listed on the National Register of Historic Places in 1988.

References 

Road bridges on the National Register of Historic Places in Pennsylvania
Bridges completed in 1908
Bridges in Lancaster County, Pennsylvania
National Register of Historic Places in Lancaster County, Pennsylvania
1908 establishments in Pennsylvania
Concrete bridges in the United States
Arch bridges in the United States